Lagouassem  is a village in Al Haouz Province of the Marrakesh-Safi region of Morocco. It is a southern suburb of Marrakesh, just south of Lahebichate.

References

Populated places in Al Haouz Province